Blake Rutherford (born May 2, 1997) is an American professional baseball outfielder in the Washington Nationals organization. He was drafted by the New York Yankees in the 1st round of the 2016 Major League Baseball draft.

Amateur career
Rutherford attended the Chaminade College Preparatory School in West Hills, California. As a freshman, Rutherford committed to play college baseball at University of California, Los Angeles (UCLA). As a junior, he hit .435 with four home runs. In August 2015, he played in the Under Armour All-America Game at Wrigley Field. As a senior, he batted .577.

Rutherford was considered one of the top prospects for the 2016 MLB draft.

Professional career

New York Yankees
Rutherford was selected by the New York Yankees with the 18th overall pick in the 2016 MLB draft, and signed a contract with the team on June 29, 2016, with a signing bonus of $3,282,000. Rutherford began his professional career with the Gulf Coast Yankees of the Rookie-level Gulf Coast League, and was promoted to the Pulaski Yankees of the Rookie-level Appalachian League after a few weeks. He finished his first professional season batting .351 with three home runs and 12 RBIs in 33 games between both clubs. Rutherford began the 2017 season with the Charleston RiverDogs of the Class A South Atlantic League.

Chicago White Sox
On July 18, 2017, the Yankees traded Rutherford, Tyler Clippard, Ian Clarkin, and Tito Polo to the Chicago White Sox for David Robertson, Todd Frazier, and Tommy Kahnle. Rutherford then joined the Class A Kannapolis Intimidators. He finished 2017 with a combined .260 batting average with two home runs and 35 RBIs in 101 games between both teams. In 2018, he played for the Winston-Salem Dash, slashing .293/.345/.436 with seven home runs, 78 RBIs, and 15 stolen bases in 115 games. He spent 2019 with the Birmingham Barons, batting .265 with seven home runs and 49 RBIs over 118 games. He was selected to play in the Arizona Fall League for the Glendale Desert Dogs following the season.

Rutherford was added to the White Sox 40–man roster following the 2019 season. He did not play a game in 2020 due to the cancellation of the minor league season. Rutherford spent the 2021 season with the Charlotte Knights where he slashed .250/.286/.404 with 11 home runs and 54 RBIs over 115 games. On March 29, 2022, the White Sox designated Rutherford for assignment when they acquired Adam Haseley. He cleared waivers and was outrighted to Triple-A on April 1, 2022. Spending the year with Triple-A Charlotte, Rutherford played in 116 games, posting a slash of .271/.311/.428 with 13 home runs, 58 RBI, and 8 stolen bases. He elected free agency on November 10, 2022.

Washington Nationals
On February 3, 2023, Rutherford signed a minor league contract with the Washington Nationals organization.

Personal life
Rutherford's older brother, Cole, was a prospect for the San Diego Padres.

References

External links

1997 births
Living people
People from Simi Valley, California
Baseball players from California
Baseball outfielders
Gulf Coast Yankees players
Pulaski Yankees players
Charleston RiverDogs players
Winston-Salem Dash players
Birmingham Barons players
Glendale Desert Dogs players
Chaminade College Preparatory School (California) alumni
Sportspeople from Ventura County, California